Patrick Osterhage (born 1 February 2000) is a German professional footballer who plays as a midfielder for VfL Bochum.

Club career
A youth product of SC Marklohe, Werder Bremen and Borussia Dortmund, Osterhage began his senior career with the reserves of Borussia Dortmund in 2020. On 7 June 2021, he transferred to VfL Bochum. He made his professional debut with Bochum in a 3–0 Bundesliga loss to RB Leipzig on 2 October 2021, coming on as a late sub in the 82nd minute.

International career
Osterhage is a youth international for Germany, having represented the Germany U18s and U19s.

References

External links
 
 

2000 births
Living people
Sportspeople from Göttingen
German footballers
Association football midfielders
Germany youth international footballers
Germany under-21 international footballers
Bundesliga players
Regionalliga players
SV Werder Bremen players
Borussia Dortmund II players
VfL Bochum players